Anne Wolf (born May 31, 1967) is a Belgian jazz pianist. She studied classical piano for ten years before entering the conservatory in 1985, where she was taught by Michel Petrucciani, Eric Legnini, and Charles Loos.

She plays as well alone as with jazz, pop, and world musicians. In 2001, she released her first trio album. She won the Golden Django for best new talent in 2002 (although she had already appeared on several recordings).

Wolf has recorded with Sttellla, Frédéric Ruymen, Citizen Jane, Kendigo, Manu Hermia, Ben N'Gabo, Cheiro de Choro, and The Big Day.

References
 Official website
 Jazz in Belgium website

Belgian jazz musicians
1967 births
Living people
Belgian jazz pianists
Belgian women musicians
21st-century pianists
Igloo Records artists
21st-century women pianists